Spalgis epius, the apefly, is a small butterfly found in the Indomalayan realm that belongs to the lycaenids or blues family. It gets its name from the supposed resemblance of its pupa to the face of an ape.

Description

Male
Upperside: dull brown, slightly darker towards the apex of the forewing; also a more or less quadrate whitish spot beyond the apex of the cell on the same wing; in some specimens this spot is slightly diffuse. Underside: pale, silky, brownish white; forewings and hindwings crossed by numerous, very slender, short, sinuous, transverse, dark brown strigae which are outwardly slenderly edged with brownish white of a shade paler than that of the ground colour; both wings with an anteciliary dark brown line with on the inner side a similar edging. Forewing, in addition, with an oval white spot beyond the cell. Cilia of both forewings and hindwings of the same shade as the ground colour of the wings. Antenna, head, thorax and abdomen pale brown, club of antennae ochraceous at apex; beneath: the palpi and thorax brownish grey, abdomen pale brown.

Female
Upperside: slightly paler brown. Forewing: the cell and apex darker; a white spot similar to that in the male but larger, beyond the apex of the cell; in most specimens extended diffusely outwards and downwards. Hindwing: similar to that of the male. Underside: precisely as in the male.

Life cycle

The caterpillars of this butterfly, like other members of the subfamily Miletinae, are entomophagous and are predators of scale insects like mealybugs. The species unlike many other lycaenid butterflies is not myrmecophilous (it has no mutualistic associations with ants).

Subspecies
S. e. epeus (India, Sri Lanka to Peninsular Malaya, Nicobars, Mergui and southern Yunnan)
S. e. dilama (Moore, 1878) (Taiwan)
S. e. fangola (Kheil, 1884) (Sumatra, Nias, possibly Borneo)
S. e. nubilus Moore, [1884] (Andamans, Pulau Tioman)
S. e. pharnus Felder, 1860 (Kai, Buru, Ambon, Halmahera, West Irian)
S. e. semperi Fruhstorfer, 1919 (northern Philippines, Luzon)
S. e. strigatus Semper, 1889 (southern to central Philippines)
S. e. substrigata (Snellen, 1878) (Sulawesi)
S. e. titius Fruhstorfer, 1919 (Java, Bali, Sumba, Sumbawa, possibly Damar and Lombok)

Cited references

See also
List of butterflies of India (Lycaenidae)

References

External links

 With images.

Butterflies described in 1851
Miletinae
Butterflies of Asia
Butterflies of Singapore
Butterflies of Borneo
Butterflies of Indochina